Scopula delitata is a moth of the  family Geometridae. It is found in western China.

References

Moths described in 1913
delitata
Moths of Asia